Faraj Abbas Al-Mass (Arabic:فرج عباس الماس; born 1961) is a Qatari footballer. He competed in the men's tournament at the 1984 Summer Olympics.

References

External links
 

1961 births
Living people
Qatari footballers
Qatar Stars League players
Qatar international footballers
Olympic footballers of Qatar
Footballers at the 1984 Summer Olympics
Place of birth missing (living people)
Date of birth missing (living people)
Association football forwards